EPF may refer to:

 .epf, a file extension for CadSoft Eagle project files
 Early pregnancy factor
 Eclipse Process Framework, an open source project
 Electricity price forecasting
 Employees Provident Fund (disambiguation)
 Endangered Planet Foundation, an American conservation organization
 Ensuring Positive Futures, a British employment program
 Episcopal Peace Fellowship, an American peace organization
 EPF School of Engineering
 Eritrean Police Force
 Established Programs Financing, a former transfer program to the provinces managed by the Government of Canada.
 European Polymer Federation
 Employees Provident Fund (Malaysia), the federal statutory body for Malaysia
 Spearhead-class expeditionary fast transport, a United States Navy shipbuilding program
 Club Penguin: Elite Penguin Force, a game released for the Nintendo DS
 European Peace Facility, a financing instrument of the Common Foreign and Security Policy